Tobi 27 - Coptic Calendar - Tobi 29

The twenty-eighth day of the Coptic month of Tobi, the fifth month of the Coptic year. On a common year, this day corresponds to January 23, of the Julian Calendar, and February 5, of the Gregorian Calendar. This day falls in the Coptic Season of Shemu, the season of the Harvest.

Commemorations

Martyrs 

 The martyrdom of Saint Kaou 
 The martyrdom of Saint Clement, Bishop of Angora 
 The martyrdom of Saint Babylas, Bishop of Thmoui

References 

Days of the Coptic calendar